Arthur Moore was an English professional rugby league footballer who played in the 1910s and 1920s. He played at representative level for England, and at club level for Hull Kingston Rovers (captain), as a forward (prior to the specialist positions of), during the era of contested scrums.

Playing career

International honours
Moore won a cap for England while at Hull Kingston Rovers, he played as a forward, i.e. number 12, in 1913 against Wales.

County Cup Final appearances
Arthur Moore played as a forward, i.e. number 8, in Hull Kingston Rovers' 10-22 defeat by Huddersfield in the 1911–12 Yorkshire County Cup Final during the 1911–12 season at Belle Vue, Wakefield on Saturday 25 November 1911, in front of a crowd of 20,000.

References

External links
 (archived by web.archive.org) Hull Kingston Rovers ~ Captains

England national rugby league team players
English rugby league players
Hull Kingston Rovers players
Place of birth missing
Place of death missing
Rugby league forwards
Year of birth missing
Year of death missing